Lorenza Bonaccorsi (born July 20, 1968 in Rome) is an Italian politician.

She graduated in Economic History at the University of Milan. Since 2001 she has worked at the Auditorium "Parco della Musica in Rome" where she directed the communications department until 2006.

Career
From 2006 to 2008 she was head of the secretariat of Paolo Gentiloni, Minister of Communications of Prodi government.

From 2008 to 2010 she was head of Institutional Relations and Relationship with the European Union for the Lazio Region.

In 2010, she returned to work at the Auditorium of Rome for developing new products and services.

Parliament election
Thanks to the “parlamentarie” – i.g the primaries for choosing the candidates members of Italian Parliament for the Democratic Party – in 2013 Lorenza Bonaccorsi was elected at the Italian Parliament in Lazio district.

She is part of the IX Commission “Transport and Telecommunications” of the Italian Parliament and since 2014 March 14 of the parliamentary Commission that oversees RAI, the Italian public TV.

Democratic Party of Lazio presidency

On June 23, 2014, the Democratic Party of Lazio elected as its President Lorenza Bonaccorsi.

National Secretariat of the Democratic Party
Since September 16, 2014, Lorenza is part of the National Secretariat of the Democratic Party led by Matteo Renzi.

References

External links
Lorenza Bonaccorsi on Partito Democratico web site   
Personal Site of Lorenza Bonaccorsi 
Lorenza Bonaccorsi's info on Italian Chamber of Deputies  
Bonaccorsi (Pd): "Su Agenda digitale e trasparenza è il momento di agire", corrierecomunicazioni.it, 30 Aprile 2014 
Lorenza Bonaccorsi: portiamo le idee di Matteo Renzi in Parlamento, Democratici-digitali.com, 28 dicembre 2012  
Nuova segreteria nazionale del Partito Democratico: intervista a Lorenza Bonaccorsi, presidente del PD Lazio, www.pdlazio.it, 24 settembre 2014  
Pd, Renzi assegna le deleghe: economia e lavoro a Taddei, organizzazione a Guerini, a Lorenza Bonaccorsi vanno Cultura e al Turismo, Il Sole 24 Ore, 18 settembre 2014 

1968 births
Living people
Politicians from Rome
Italian Communist Party politicians
Democratic Party of the Left politicians
Democrats of the Left politicians
Democratic Party (Italy) politicians
Deputies of Legislature XVII of Italy
21st-century Italian women politicians
University of Milan alumni
20th-century Italian women
Women members of the Chamber of Deputies (Italy)